CITA International School, also known simply as CITA, is a private, Christian school in Rivers State, Nigeria. CITA offers nursery, primary and secondary school education to children ages 6 months through to 16 years. The school was founded on 15 May 1981. It initially functioned as a nursery and primary school until 2001, when the high school section was established.

Currently, the nursery and primary school is sited on a well planned government residential area of Rumuogba in Port Harcourt, while the secondary school is at  Rumuochokota in Etche local government area.

References

External links

Schools in Port Harcourt
Educational institutions established in 1981
Secondary schools in Rivers State
1981 establishments in Nigeria
1980s establishments in Rivers State
Primary schools in Rivers State
Christian schools in Nigeria